Camelinae is a subfamily of artiodactyls of the family Camelidae, known from Asia, Eurasia, South America, North America, and Africa appearing during the Eocene 38 mya, existing for approximately .

Camelinae include the tribes Camelini and Lamini. A third tribe, Camelopini, created by S. D. Webb (1965), was formerly included, but was discarded by J. A. Harrison (1979) after it was shown to be polyphyletic: it consisted of the genera Camelops and Megatylopus, which were moved to Camelini and Lamini respectively.

Taxonomy
Camelinae was named by Gray (1821). Its type is Camelus. It was assigned to Camelidae by Stanley et al. (1994) and Ruez (2005).

References

Camelids
Mammal subfamilies